Daniel Shawn Maddix (born 11 October 1967) is a former professional footballer who played as a defender, notably in the Premier League for Queens Park Rangers, having come through the academy at Tottenham Hotspur. He also had spells in the English Football League for Southend United, Sheffield Wednesday and Barnet before finishing his career in non-league with Grays Athletic. Born in England, he was called up to represent Jamaica where he earned one cap during a 1998 FIFA World Cup warm-up game.

Whilst with Barnet in 2004, Maddix was temporarily appointed as caretaker manager, he has since worked away from the sport and has only coached at amateur level.

Club career
Maddix started his career as a trainee at Tottenham Hotspur but never appeared for the first team. He was loaned to Southend United in 1986 where he made two appearances, however he departed the club after one senior season in the first team at White Hart Lane.

He finally left for Division 1 rivals Queens Park Rangers in 1987. He made 348 appearances for QPR spanning 13 seasons, scoring 18 goals. He made his debut in November 1987 at Queens Park Rangers and was an effective centre half alongside Alan McDonald. He spent a handful of seasons in the Premier League with QPR, and continued to play for the Loftus Road club when they were relegated in 1996.

He signed with Sheffield Wednesday in 2001 where he made over 50 starts but was released after the club suffered relegation to the third tier of English football in the 2002–03 season.

He signed to Barnet on 12 July 2003 and ended his career in December 2004. He was briefly joint caretaker manager with Ian Hendon between the departure of Martin Allen and the arrival of Paul Fairclough.

Following his departure from Barnet, Maddix signed with Grays Athletic and stayed with the club until the end of the 2005–06 season.

International career
Despite being English by birth, Maddix's Jamaican roots saw him picked for the Jamaica in 1998 in a World Cup warm-up game against Iran.

Personal life
Danny spends some of his time coaching a Chigwell-based youth football club Colebrook Royals.

References

External links

1967 births
Living people
People from Ashford, Kent
Tottenham Hotspur F.C. players
Southend United F.C. players
Queens Park Rangers F.C. players
Sheffield Wednesday F.C. players
Barnet F.C. players
Barnet F.C. non-playing staff
Grays Athletic F.C. players
Premier League players
Jamaica international footballers
Jamaican footballers
Barnet F.C. managers
Association football defenders
English people of Jamaican descent
Jamaican football managers
Black British sportspeople